E. M. Perera was the 36th Surveyor General of Sri Lanka. He was appointed in 1991, succeeding S. T. Herat, and held the office until 1991. He was succeeded by Thamotharam Somasekaram.

References

P